Alerta Airport  is an airstrip serving Alerta, a village near the Bolivian border in the Ucayali Region of Peru. The village is on the Río Muymanu (sv), a stream in the Amazon basin.

The runway may have  usable length due to encroaching vegetation.

See also

Transport in Peru
List of airports in Peru

References

External links 
OpenStreetMap - Alerta Airport
OurAirports Alerta Airport]

Airports in Peru
Buildings and structures in Ucayali Region